The Coat of arms of the Community of Madrid was adopted in 1983. The field is crimson red with two yellow or golden castles with seven five-pointed white or silver stars on top, arranged four and three. The crest is the Spanish Royal Crown.

The red field symbolizes historic Castile, of which Madrid had long been part, and the two castles represent the two Castilian communities and Madrid as their union. The seven stars come from the coat of arms of the capital representing the constellation Ursa Major, which is visible from the city. The five points of the stars refer to the five provinces which about the Community. The royal crown symbolizes Madrid as the royal seat.

Coats of arms of the Province of Madrid

See also
Coat of arms of Madrid (City)
Flag of the Community of Madrid

References

Community of Madrid
Culture in Madrid
Madrid
Madrid
Madrid
Madrid
Madrid